The following is a list of notable Havyaka Brahmin people:
 Ramakrishna Hegde
 Chittani Ramachandra Hegde
 Gangadharendra Saraswati
 Tejasvi Surya

Religious leaders
 Raghaveshwara Bharathi- Ramachandrapura Mutt Pontiff and Guru of Havyakas.
 Gangadharendra Saraswati - Sonda Swarnavalli Mutt Pontiff and Guru of Havyakas.

References

Kannada Brahmins
havyakas
Havigannada people